Borogothus is an extinct genus of trilobite arthropod. It lived during the Arenig stage of the Ordovician Period, approximately 478 to 471 million years ago.

References

Asaphida genera
Asaphidae
Ordovician trilobites